Yevgeni Yuryevich Malkov (born 12 July 1988) is a former Russian football player.

Club career
He made his debut in the Russian Premier League in 2008 for FC Saturn Moscow Oblast.

External links
 
  Profile on the FC Saturn Moscow Oblast site

References

1988 births
Living people
People from Elektrostal
Russian footballers
FC Saturn Ramenskoye players
Russian Premier League players
FC Vityaz Podolsk players
Association football defenders
FC Avangard Kursk players
FC Dynamo Saint Petersburg players
Sportspeople from Moscow Oblast